Michael Lanigan is an entrepreneur and IndyCar Series team owner.

Lanigan founded a division of his father's company, Mi-Jack Construction Equipment in Indianapolis in 1973. In 1989 he returned to his hometown of Chicago to become president of the company. The company produces rubber-tire gantry cranes. In 1992 Mi-Jack began sponsoring cars competing in CART and the Indianapolis 500. Lanigan now heads the Lanco group, a wide-reaching conglomerate involved in cranes, heavy equipment, industrial equipment, entertainment, motorsport interests and is part of a joint venture that operates the Panama Canal Railway.

Lanigan expanded his sponsorship into team ownership in 2001, joining forces with Éric Bachelart to co-own Conquest Racing which competed in the IndyCar Series in 2001 and 2002, then the Champ Car World Series from 2003 to 2006. Lanigan sold his interest in Conquest following the 2007 season to join the ownership group at Newman / Haas Racing, which became Newman / Haas / Lanigan Racing, a much more successful Champ Car team. N/H/L joined the IndyCar Series following the unification between Champ Car and IndyCar prior to the 2008 season. He was also a partial owner of Carl A. Haas Motorsports in NASCAR in 2007. During the 2010 season, he left the ownership group of Newman/Haas. In December 2010, he joined the ownership team of Rahal Letterman Racing which was renamed Rahal Letterman Lanigan Racing. The team has IndyCar operations and races full-time in the WeatherTech SportsCar Championship.

Lanigan also took over the promoter position of Champ Car's Grand Prix of Houston in 2006 and Grand Prix of Cleveland in 2007, neither of which survived the merger to appear on the IndyCar Series schedule. Houston returned to the schedule for the 2013 season but the revived race only lasted two years, removed again for the 2015 season.

Lanigan won his first Indianapolis 500 with Takuma Sato in 2020.

References

Living people
Businesspeople from Chicago
IndyCar Series team owners
Rahal Letterman Lanigan Racing
Year of birth missing (living people)